The Immediate Geographic Region of Monte Carmelo is one of the 3 immediate geographic regions in the Intermediate Geographic Region of Uberlândia, one of the 70 immediate geographic regions in the Brazilian state of Minas Gerais and one of the 509 of Brazil, created by the National Institute of Geography and Statistics (IBGE) in 2017.

Municipalities 
It comprises 7 municipalities.

 Abadia dos Dourados 
 Douradoquara  
 Estrela do Sul  
 Grupiara  
 Iraí de Minas  
 Monte Carmelo
 Romaria

See also 

 List of Intermediate and Immediate Geographic Regions of Minas Gerais

References 

Geography of Minas Gerais